The Progressive Socialist Party of Ukraine (PSPU) is a banned pro-Russian National Bolshevik political party in Ukraine led by Nataliya Vitrenko. The party was represented in Ukraine's national parliament between 1998 and 2002.

History
The party was created by Nataliya Vitrenko, a then dissident member of the Socialist Party of Ukraine (SPU) in April 1996. She led a group of more radical SPU members who opposed what they regarded as revisionist tendencies in the Socialist Party. In October 1995 they had left that party. 

The Progressive Socialist Party of Ukraine is a party that supports the Eurasian Economic Union as an alternative to the EU and uses left-wing rhetoric. PSPU traditionally campaigns on an anti-NATO, anti-IMF and pro-Russian platform.  During the 1998 parliamentary elections the party won 4.04% of the vote and 16 seats. The party's candidate for the 1999 presidential elections, Nataliya Vitrenko, came 4th, with 10.97% of the vote in the first round.

The party's parliamentary faction was dissolved in February 2000.

At the legislative elections on 30 March 2002, the party established the Nataliya Vitrenko Bloc alliance, including the Party of Educators of Ukraine. It won 3.22% of the votes, little short of passing the 4% threshold needed to enter the Verkhovna Rada. PSPU was a vocal opponent of President Leonid Kuchma but supported Viktor Yanukovych, Ukrainian prime minister since 2002, during the 2004 elections.  After the Orange Revolution of 2004, the party joined the opposition to new president Viktor Yushchenko in a coalition with the  "Derzhava" (State) party led by former Ukrainian prosecutor Gennady Vasilyev. In the March 2006 parliamentary elections, the party again failed to gain any seats in Parliament, participating as People's Opposition Bloc of Natalia Vitrenko winning 2,93%. At the 2007 parliamentary elections the party failed once more to enter the parliament, its result dropped to 1,32%.

In the run-up to the 2010 presidential election the Progressive Socialist Party of Ukraine refused to join the Bloc of Left and Center-left Forces since it did not want to be in the same election bloc as the Socialist Party of Ukraine. Instead the party tried to nominate Natalia Vitrenko again as their candidate in that election but the Central Election Commission of Ukraine refused to register her for failure to pay the required 2.5 million hryvnya nomination deposit. Eventually the Progressive Socialist Party of Ukraine supported Party of Regions leader Viktor Yanukovych in the runoff of the 2010 presidential election.

During the 2010 Ukrainian local elections, the party only won three representatives in the Sevastopol municipality.

The party did not participate in the 2012 parliamentary elections.

In 2011, the PSPU decided to join the People's Front for Russia.

The party did not participate in the 2014 parliamentary elections.

The party took part in the October 2015 Ukrainian local elections as part of the umbrella party Left Opposition.

In the 2020 local elections the party did not nominate candidates for deputies at all except for a candidate for mayor of Romny.

On 20 March 2022 the PSPU was one of several political parties suspended by the National Security and Defense Council of Ukraine during the 2022 Russian invasion of Ukraine, along with Derzhava, Left Opposition, Nashi, Opposition Bloc, Opposition Platform — For Life, Party of Shariy, Socialist Party of Ukraine, Union of Left Forces, and the Volodymyr Saldo Block.

In June 2022 various court proceedings tried to ban the parties suspended on 20 March 2022. The Progressive Socialist Party of Ukraine was one of two parties that actively opposed its banning. (The other party was Opposition Platform — For Life.) On 27 September 2022 the final appeal against the party's ban was dismissed by the Supreme Court of Ukraine, meaning that the party was fully banned in Ukraine.

Election results

Presidential elections

Rada electoral results

Rada Election results maps

Ideology
The party favoures Ukraine's full-scale entry in the Eurasian Economic Community (including its Customs Union); the protection of the non-aligned status of Ukraine; abolition of NATO exercises in Ukraine; giving the Russian language status as official language along with Ukrainian; annulment of former President Viktor Yushchenko's decrees on awarding the title of Hero of Ukraine to Stepan Bandera and Roman Shukhevych.

The party has close ties with the Eurasian Youth Union and its leader Aleksandr Dugin.

Notes

References

External links
 Official party website
 "People's Opposition" pro-Vitrenko website

1996 establishments in Ukraine
Anti-Americanism
Banned political parties in Ukraine
Eurosceptic parties in Ukraine
National Bolshevik parties
Pan-Slavism
Political parties established in 1996
Political parties disestablished in 2022
Political parties in Ukraine
Russian political parties in Ukraine
Social conservative parties
Socialist Party of Ukraine breakaway groups